Veli Can (Persian form: Vali Jan) (fl. c. 1580 to c. 1600) was an Ottoman painter known for his works in saz style.

Born in Tabriz, according to Mustafa Ali he was a student of Siyavush and came to Istanbul c. 1580. Under Murad III (1574-1595) saz style (from saz: "reed"; long, feathery leaf which was the basic element of the compositions) reached its apogee. Veli Can is the most prominent of the later 16th-century painters associated with the albums compiled for Murad III. He worked for the sultan and album pages are, "more or less speculatively attributed to him". To judge from these, he was primarily interested in figural subjects. The large number of dubious attributions to Veli Can had made the definition of his style impossible until Denny discovered a tiny hidden signature on a drawing of a bird and grotesque head in a foliage (Topkapı Pal. Lib., H. 2836, see illustration). From this drawing he has convincingly assigned to Veli Can three other drawings (Topkapı Pal. Lib., H. 2147, fol. 23v and H. 2162, fol. 8v (see illustrations); Mus. Jacquemart-André, MS. 261). According to Sheila R. Canby: "The rounded serrations of the leaf edges and bold, black sweeping lines that form the spines of the leaves place these drawings squarely in the saz [style] .... The grotesque head in Veli Can’s signed drawing, however, is clearly borrowed from the style of his mentor".

Mustafa Ali claimed that, despite Veli Can's gifts as a draughtsman, his style did not progress. His name appears in the registers of the palace workshop for 1595–6 and 1596–7 with a daily salary of seven and nine akçe, a mediocre sum, which bears out Mustafa Ali's assessment. Veli Can is known mostly for his angel (peri) figures in the style of Shah Quli and for the figures of young men in the tradition of his mentor Siyavush. His name became famous in the world of Ottoman art and "appear to have wrought a particular magic on the price structure in the marketplace". Veli Can was the historical template for the character of "Olive" in novel My Name Is Red by Orhan Pamuk.

References

Bibliography 
 
 
 

Miniaturists from the Ottoman Empire
16th-century artists from the Ottoman Empire
People from Tabriz
Iranian emigrants to the Ottoman Empire